Van Winkle is a Dutch surname. It is the Anglicization of Van Winkel, meaning "from shop" in modern Dutch, but originating as  "from Winkel", a number of places in the Low Countries and Germany. Perhaps the most famous Van Winkle is the title character of "Rip Van Winkle", an 1819 short story by Washington Irving.

People with the surname include:

Archie Van Winkle (1925-1986), U.S. Marine awarded the Medal of Honor
Barrik Van Winkle, American linguistic and legal anthropologist
Isaac Homer Van Winkle (1870-1943), American attorney and Attorney General of Oregon
Marshall Van Winkle (1869-1957), U.S. Representative and grandnephew of Peter G. Van Winkle
Mina Van Winkle (1875-1933), American crusading social worker, suffragist and groundbreaking police lieutenant
Peter G. Van Winkle (1808-1872), U.S. Senator
Vanilla Ice (born Robert Van Winkle in 1967), American rapper 
Ryan Van Winkle (born 1977), American poet
Travis Van Winkle (born 1982), American actor
Winant Van Winkle (1879–1943), New Jersey state senator

See also
Pappy Van Winkle's Family Reserve, a brand of whisky

Surnames of Dutch origin